The World Figure Skating Hall of Fame serves as a repository for the sport of figure skating. The World Figure Skating Hall of Fame is where the greatest names in the history of the sport are honored. It is located in Colorado Springs, Colorado, United States.

Skaters such as Dick Button, Katarina Witt, Midori Ito, Sonja Henie, Alexei Yagudin, and Michelle Kwan have been honored in the Hall of Fame.

Inductees

 * Indicates that they were inducted into the golden category, which considers contributions prior to WWII.
 ** Dmitriev was inducted with both partners he won Olympic gold with 
 *** Indicates that they were inducted into the legends category, which considers contributions prior to 1960.

See also
Skate Canada Hall of Fame
United States Figure Skating Hall of Fame

References

External links
World Figure Skating Hall of Fame – official website
Hall of Fame Members: World Hall of Fame webpage. World Figure Skating Museum and Hall of Fame website. Retrieved 2010-08-09.
Home webpage. World Figure Skating Museum and Hall of Fame website. Retrieved 2010-08-09.
Visit webpage. World Figure Skating Museum and Hall of Fame website. Retrieved 2010-08-09.
Archives webpage. World Figure Skating Museum and Hall of Fame website. Retrieved 2010-08-09.
Board of Trustees members and Advisory Council members webpage. World Figure Skating Museum and Hall of Fame website. Retrieved 2010-08-09.

Figure skating museums and halls of fame
Figure
Sports museums in Colorado
Sports in Colorado Springs, Colorado
Museums in Colorado Springs, Colorado
Awards established in 1976